Excerebration is an ancient Egyptian mummification procedure of removal of the brain from corpses prior to actual embalming. Greek writer Herodotus, a frequent visitor to Egypt, wrote in the fifth century B.C. about the process, "Having agreed on a price, the bearers go away, and the workmen, left alone in their place, embalm the body. If they do this in a perfect way, they first draw out part of the brain through the nostrils with an iron hook, and inject certain drugs into the rest".

An object more than 6.8 inches long, probably made from plants in the group Monocotyledon (including palm and bamboo), would have been used for liquefying and removing the brain. The instrument would be inserted through a hole punched into the ethmoid bone near the nose via a chisel. Some parts of the brain would be wrapped around this stick and pulled out, and the other parts would be liquefied. In order to drain the remaining liquified brain and cerebral fluid the individual would be put on their abdomen or their head would be lifted.

Evolution of Excerebration
Excerebration can be traced all the way back to the Old Kingdom through Greco-Roman Egypt. The evidence of excerebration consists of primarily skull base perforations. During the Old and Middle Kingdom there was a low frequency of skull perforations. Leading many authors to provide an alternative entrance via the foramen magnum. Once we enter the New Kingdom it is apparent through past skulls that the primary entrance was through the base of the skull using a transnasal excerebration occurred.

Over the millennia excerebration has changed. In the Old and Middle Kingdoms a transethmoidal excerebration was the normal form. With the assistance of modern technology and CT scanning more and more evidence has arisen as to where in the skull excerebration occurred. Through many CT scans and many skulls it has been determined that over time the transethmoidal approach was shifted towards a transsphenoidal approach. As more and more evidence has been compiled originally excerebration was done through a transnasal approach, which moved towards a transethmoidal approach, which finally a transsphenoidal approach. However, there is also evidence of a combined transethmoidal-transsphenoidal version of excerebration that could have been used in the Third Intermediate Period.

Religious Aspects of Excerebration
In order to extract all organs from the body embalmers would make an incision on the left side of the abdomen. Similar to this, excerebration was rarely ever seen through the right nostril and almost exclusively through the left nostril. Knowing that the body would have been laid with the head to the north all incisions and excerebration would have taken place on the eastern side of the body. For convenience and accessibility, it would have been more practical to make incisions on the western side of the body or the right side, however, everything was done on the left side, signifying some degree of symbolism or religion was involved. The notion that the right side was honored, while the left was inferior, is a notion common in ancient Egypt. Not only this, but resurrection was also seen as a journey from west to east. Therefore, one could infer that it was more honorable and respectful to the deceased if excerebration and the removal of other organs were performed via cuts made on the left or eastern side of the body.

Modern Comparisons

Many have said that Ancient Egyptians were the first to learn about the brain and document their findings. In fact they were, they have some of the oldest documentation on the spinal cord and the brain in the world. There are also many surgeries that take a very similar approach as excerebration did in the past. Specifically now endoscopic skull base surgery can be seen directly in excerebration with their shared approach transnasally. Excerebration was an important procedure in Ancient Egypt and even today a version of excerebration can be life saving for some.

See also
Brain biopsy

References

Huffington Post: Mummy Brain - Gray Matter-Removal Tool Found In Ancient Egyptian Skull

Brain
Mummification